The Alaska Marine Highway (AMH) or the Alaska Marine Highway System (AMHS) is a ferry service operated by the U.S. state of Alaska. It has its headquarters in Ketchikan, Alaska.

The Alaska Marine Highway System operates along the south-central coast of the state, the eastern Aleutian Islands and the Inside Passage of Alaska and British Columbia, Canada. Ferries serve communities in Southeast Alaska that have no road access, and the vessels can transport people, freight, and vehicles. AMHS's  of routes go as far south as Bellingham, Washington, in the contiguous United States and as far west as Unalaska/Dutch Harbor, with a total of 32 terminals throughout Alaska, British Columbia, and Washington. It is part of the National Highway System and receives federal highway funding. It is also the only method of transportation of vehicles between the state and the contiguous United States, not requiring international customs and immigration.

The Alaska Marine Highway System is a rare example in the U.S. of a shipping line offering regularly scheduled service for the primary purpose of transportation of passengers rather than of leisure or entertainment. Voyages can last many days, but, in contrast to the luxury of a typical cruise line, cabins cost extra, and most food is served cafeteria-style.

History

Pre-statehood
The forerunner to the Alaska Marine Highway was the Chilkoot Motorship Lines, founded in 1948 by Haines residents Steve Homer and Ray Gelotte. They operated a weekly service from Tee Harbor (north of Juneau) to Haines and Skagway, connecting the territorial capital to the international road system. The Chilkoot Motorship Lines was purchased by the territorial government, and moved under the Territorial Board of Road Commissioners in 1951. In 1957, the MV Chillkoot was replaced by the MV Chilkat, which remained a part of the system until being decommissioned in 1988.

A state ferry system
In 1959, the year Alaska became a state, voters approved an $18 million ($ million today) bond package to improve the ferry system throughout the Southeast and Southcentral regions. The package included 4 new vessels and new docks throughout. The first of these new vessels built was the MV Malaspina, followed closely by the MV Matanuska and MV Taku. With 3 new ships, and a new name, the Alaska Marine Highway System (AMHS) was born.

The following year, the ocean-certified MV Tustumena was completed, the Chilkat moved to Prince William Sound, and the AMHS started service in Southcentral. In 1969, that service was expanded with the addition of the MV E.L. Bartlett, in service with the state until 2004.

Farther south
In 1967, two events acted to severely restrict transportation to and from Southeast Alaska. A slide took out the Alaska Highway to the North, and BC Ferries MV Queen of Prince Rupert ran aground, severely limiting transfer passengers' ability to move between the AMHS Southern terminus of Prince Rupert, British Columbia to Seattle. Until this time, portions of the passage between Southeast Alaska and Washington State were classified as outside waters, and none of the vessels the AMHS operated in Southeast Alaska had the necessary ocean-going certification required to carry passengers on outside waters. Citing the need for a transportation link between Alaska and the rest of the United States, then governor Wally Hickel ordered the AMHS to send a vessel south to Seattle while putting a request to Congress to re-classify the route as inside waters. The federal government agreed to do so, which left the AMHS with a significantly longer route system, and no new vessels to serve it.

Faced with the lengthy construction time and cost of building a new vessel, the AMHS looked abroad to find a quicker solution. The Stena Britannica, just a year old, was purchased and rechristened the MV Wickersham. While the Wickersham was relatively inexpensive to purchase, and could be added to the system quickly, she was never re-flagged as an American ship, and so commercial operation between US ports of call was a violation of the Merchant Marine Act of 1920 (commonly known as the Jones Act). Initially, the State of Alaska had felt they would be able to get a waiver of the Jones Act for the Wickersham, but that request was blocked, severely limiting the scheduling flexibility of the ship. While the Wickersham could pick up passengers in Washington State and deliver them to Alaska if there were an intermediary stop in Canada, moving passengers within Alaska was not allowed. Additionally, as the Wickersham was not specifically built for Alaskan ports, she was limited as to which ports she could dock at. The AMHS ordered the new construction of the MV Columbia, which replaced the Wickersham on the mainline Seattle route in 1974.

The southern terminus of the AMHS remained in Seattle until October 1989, when it moved to the Bellingham Cruise Terminal in Fairhaven, Washington, after signing a 20-year lease with the city of Bellingham.

Feeder service
Facing the need to increase capacity, both the Matanuska and Malaspina were stretched by 56 feet, beyond the capacity of some of the smaller harbors and leaving the Taku as the only AMHS ship in Southeast able to serve some of the smaller communities. To serve the smaller communities of Southeast, the AMHS ordered the MV LeConte in 1974 and the MV Aurora in 1978. These would be the last new ships built for the AMHS for 20 years, ending the initial construction of the AMHS.

Exxon Valdez oil spill
On March 24, 1989, the Exxon Valdez struck Bligh Reef in Prince William Sound. The State of Alaska's on scene response was managed from the E.L. Bartlett, later relieved by the Aurora. Suction trucks were placed in the car-deck, temporarily converting the ferry into a spill response vessel. The State of Alaska determined a new vessel was necessary, and the new vessel should be designed from the beginning to be able to take on a command and control role in the case of another disaster. Funded in part by settlement money from Exxon, the MV Kennicott joined the system in 1998.

Day boats
New construction since the Kennicott has focused on day boats, which can run their expected schedule and return home within a 12-hour shift.

In 2004, the MV Lituya was added to the fleet to make the  trip between Ketchikan and Metlakatla in Southeast. With a design heavily influenced by oil rig supply vessels, she is unique among the fleet with an open car deck and limited passenger facilities. Costing only $9.5 million ($ million today), her low fuel consumption and small crew complement make her the most economical vessel in the fleet, giving the AMHS real-world data on the effectiveness of small, short-haul ferries in Southeast waters.

Labor strike 

In 2019, a labor strike involving over 400 members of the Inlandboatman's Union of the Pacific shut down the AMH for several days between July 24 and August 2. This strike, the first one the AMH had seen in 42 years, led to a $3.2 million loss in revenue and reimbursements and was resolved with federal mediation.

Routes

Southeast Alaska
The southeast AMHS route system is divided into two subsystems: the mainline routes which typically take more than one day for the ship to travel; and shorter routes where the vessels depart their home port in the morning, travel to destination ports and then return to their home port on the same day. The shorter routes are commonly referred to as "day boat" routes.

The mainline routes carry a high percentage of tourists in the summer, and provide service between Bellingham, Washington, or Prince Rupert, British Columbia, and Skagway, Alaska. Along the way, the ships stop in Ketchikan, Wrangell, Petersburg, Sitka, Juneau, and Haines. The smaller communities Kake and Hoonah are served by certain mainline sailings. During 2008, the five largest AMHS vessels were used on the Southeast mainline routes.

Day boat service was also provided on the North Lynn Canal route during the peak summer season by MV Malaspina. This route provides round-trip service between Juneau, Haines and Skagway. The day boat routes connect the smaller communities of Southeast Alaska with each other and with the Southeast Alaska mainline communities (Ketchikan, Petersburg, Wrangell, Sitka, Juneau, Haines and Skagway) that serve as regional centers for commerce, government health services, and/or connections to other transportation systems. The day boat routes primarily serve local residents, and include Angoon, Hoonah, Kake, Metlakatla, Pelican, and Tenakee.

In 2008, three AMHS vessels provided service on the day boat routes. The MV Lituya is dedicated to providing day boat service between Ketchikan and Metlakatla. The Southeast System connects with the continental road system at Bellingham, Washington, Prince Rupert, British Columbia, and in Alaska at Haines and Skagway.

Cross-gulf service
When the MV Kennicott, a vessel certified to operate in open waters, joined the fleet in the summer 1998 the ferry system expanded to include regular cross-gulf sailings. Also known as "inter-tie trips", these sailings connect Southeastern Alaska with Southcentral and Southwest regions of the state. All cross-gulf trips include a stop at the port of Yakutat, a community unique in that it is served only on a cross-gulf route. During 2008, the AMHS provided Yakutat with 10 port calls.

Southwest Alaska
The Southwest system serves Prince William Sound, Kodiak Island, the Alaska Peninsula, and the Aleutian Islands. The MV Tustumena provides regular service between Kodiak, Port Lions, Seldovia and Homer. In 2008, between April and October, the MV Tustumena traveled out the Aleutian chain once a month to Unalaska/Dutch Harbor, stopping at Chignik, Sand Point, King Cove, False Pass, Akutan and Cold Bay.
This trip is not made in the winter because of adverse weather conditions. In 2008 service in Prince William Sound to Valdez, Cordova and Whittier was provided by the MV Aurora. The MV Chenega provided additional service during the summer season, and the MV Kennicott provided supplemental service. AMHS also provided fifty-five stops in the village of Tatitlek and thirty-six stops in Chenega Bay. Tourist passengers add a significant percentage to the Prince William Sound traffic in the summer, especially between Valdez and Whittier. In the winter months when traffic demand was significantly reduced and weather conditions worsened, the MV Chenega was moved to North Lynn Canal to replace the Fairweather for its overhaul period. The MV Tustumena also underwent a CIP project, leaving the MV Aurora to provide service between the ports.

Communities served
The Alaska Marine Highway's main hub is in Juneau, though administrative offices are in Ketchikan. Other smaller operational hubs include Cordova (Prince William Sound), Ketchikan (southern Panhandle), and Kodiak (Southcentral Alaska).

The AMHS serves the following communities year-round:
Akutan
Angoon
Bellingham, Washington
Chenega Bay
Chignik
Cold Bay
Cordova
False Pass
Gustavus
Haines
Homer
Hoonah
Juneau
Kake
Ketchikan
King Cove
Kodiak
Metlakatla
Ouzinkie
Petersburg
Port Lions
Prince Rupert, British Columbia
Sand Point
Seldovia
Sitka
Skagway
Tatitlek
Tenakee Springs
Unalaska/Dutch Harbor
Valdez
Whittier
Wrangell
Yakutat

Current vessels
The following vessels, from smallest to largest, currently serve in the Alaska Marine Highway's fleet:
 MV Lituya, solely dedicated to serving the Ketchikan-Annette Bay route, which includes the city of Metlakatla.
 MV Aurora operates in Prince William Sound.
 MV LeConte serves the feeder communities in the northern Southeast as a day boat.
 MV Tazlina, the newest Alaska-Class vessel and the first AMHS ship to be built in Alaska.
 MV Tustumena, serves Southcentral and Aleutian Island communities.
 MV Malaspina, runs backup mainline throughout Southeast Alaska when the MV Columbia is off-line for service. During the summer months it serves a daily shuttle route between Juneau, Haines and Skagway.
 MV Matanuska, runs mainline throughout Southeast Alaska, frequently beginning in Prince Rupert, and occasionally running to Bellingham.
 MV Kennicott, runs mainline throughout Southeast Alaska, frequently beginning in Prince Rupert and making a cross-Gulf of Alaska trip to Southcentral Alaska once a month.
 MV Columbia, runs mainline throughout Southeast Alaska, usually beginning in Bellingham.

Most Alaska Marine Highway System vessels are built for multiple-day voyages due to the large distances between ports. For example, it takes just under three days to travel from Bellingham to Skagway, and 18 hours for the Sitka to Juneau "milk run". Because of this, larger vessels (MV Tustumena and larger) come with staterooms, while all mainline vessels have solariums, showers, and lounges for sleeping. Hot food services and, on the MV Columbia, a sit-down restaurant are also offered.

In July 2011 the Marine Highway began the bidding process to build the first of what they refer to as "Alaska-Class Vessels", made to travel shorter routes. They would not have staterooms available for passengers. One hundred-twenty million dollars have been set aside for the project and the ferries are scheduled to be delivered in 2018. These ships will be named the MV Tazlina and the MV Hubbard.

All current vessels are named after Alaskan glaciers.

Retired vessels
In addition to the current fleet, the following vessels have been retired:
 MV Bartlett
 MV Chilkat
 MV Chilkoot
 MV Taku
 MV Wickersham
 MV Chenega (fast ferry) had been laid up in Seattle, Washington, Lake Washington Ship Canal, due to service reductions. Has been sold to the Spanish company Trasmapi as of 2021.
 MV Fairweather (fast ferry) operated a variety of routes in Southeast Alaska. Has been sold to the Spanish company Trasmapi as of 2021.

Traffic
The AMHS carries around 350,000 passengers and 100,000 vehicles every year. In their 2008 Annual Traffic Volume Report, the Alaska Marine Highway reported moving 340,412 passengers and 109,839 vehicles; equating to the highest passenger ridership in eight years and the highest vehicle ridership in sixteen. The Ferry is very popular with summer tourists (one of the primary reasons Bellingham and Prince Rupert are AMHS destinations). Tent cities commonly sprout up on the aft of mainline vessels, and for budget travellers, the AMHS is one of the top modes of transportation to the "Last Frontier". Service drops off significantly in winter. Vessels usually undergo overhauls and renovations during this period due to the decline in passenger and vehicle traffic (attributed to a lack of tourists).

See also

 BC Ferries, British Columbia's ferry system, similar to the Alaska Marine Highway
 Inter-Island Ferry Authority, southeast Alaskan ferry system that operates out of Prince of Wales Island
 Puget Sound Navigation Company, a private company connecting Washington and British Columbia
 Washington State Ferries, state-operated ferry system serving Puget Sound, the San Juan Islands and Sidney, British Columbia

Together, these services cover the length of the Inside Passage. They connect at a number of locations.

References

External links

 
 Our Route
 America's Byways - Alaska Marine Highway (Inside Passage)
 America's Byways - Alaska Marine Highway (Gulf Coast)
 Sitnews.us: "The Grand Ships of the Alaska Marine Highway System"
 Reports
 Operating Plan

 
Transportation in Haines Borough, Alaska
Transportation in Juneau, Alaska
Transportation in Kenai Peninsula Borough, Alaska
Transportation in Ketchikan Gateway Borough, Alaska
Transportation in Municipality of Skagway Borough, Alaska
Transportation in Unorganized Borough, Alaska
Transportation in Whatcom County, Washington